Blessing Chimezie Didia is a Nigerian medical doctor, professor of Anatomy and politician from Omerelu, Rivers State. From 1991 to 1993, he was Chairman of Ikwerre local government area, and as of 2018, is the Vice-Chancellor of Rivers State University

See also
List of people from Rivers State

References

External links
Rivers State University of Science and Technology website

Living people
Medical doctors from Rivers State
Rivers State Peoples Democratic Party politicians
Mayors of places in Rivers State
Heads of Rivers State government agencies and parastatals
Year of birth missing (living people)